The 2003 Benue State gubernatorial election occurred on April 19, 2003. Incumbent Governor, PDP's George Akume won election for a second term, defeating ANPP's Paul Unongo and two other candidates.

George Akume was the PDP nominee at the primary election. He retained Ogiri Ajene as his running mate.

Electoral system
The Governor of Benue State is elected using the plurality voting system.

Results
A total of four candidates registered with the Independent National Electoral Commission to contest in the election. Incumbent Governor, George Akume won election for a second term, defeating three other candidates.

The total number of registered voters in the state was 1,755,528. However, only 70.27% (i.e. 1,233,522) of registered voters participated in the exercise.

References 

Benue State gubernatorial elections
Benue State gubernatorial election
Benue State gubernatorial election